Jagdgeschwader 144 was a fighter wing of Nazi Germany's Luftwaffe in World War II.

144
Military units and formations established in 1938